Brave Warrior is a 1952 Technicolor American Western film, directed by Spencer Gordon Bennet. It stars Jon Hall and Christine Larsen. The story is based on events during the War of 1812 and the Battle of Tippecanoe, but contains historical inaccuracies, mainly in that Tecumseh is depicted as siding with the Americans and not the British.

Plot synopsis
In the Indiana Territory of the early 19th century, conflict arises between the United States and Great Britain over territory and boundaries. Each side endeavors to gain the support of the Shawnee Indian tribes in the area. Governor William Henry Harrison enlists the aid of Steve Ruddell, whose friendship with the Shawnee chief Tecumseh goes back to childhood.

Tecumseh's leadership of the Shawnee is contested by his brother Tenskwatawa, known as The Prophet, who sides with the British. Tecumseh, who grew up as a childhood playmate of Steve and of Laura McGregor, loves Steve as a brother and hopes to marry Laura. But Laura is in love with Steve. Laura's father, Shayne McGregor, secretly leads local support for the British against the Americans, even though it risks the life and love of his daughter. Everything comes to a head at the Battle of Tippecanoe.

Cast
 Jon Hall as Steve Ruddell
 Christine Larsen as Laura MacGregor
 Jay Silverheels as Tecumseh
 Michael Ansara as Tenskwatawa, "The Prophet"
 Harry Cording as Shayne MacGregor
 James Seay as Gov. William Henry Harrison
 George Eldredge as Capt. Barny Demming
 Leslie Denison as Gen. Proctor
 Rory Mallinson as Barker
 Rusty Wescoatt as Standish

Production

Film locations
Agoura Ranch, Agoura, California was used as the MacGregor ranch. Burro Flats, Simi Hills was used to shoot the Indian charge. Corriganville Movie Ranch was also used. Archival footage of the dugout set attacked by Indians and the fort set in When the Redskins Rode (1951).

Reception

Home media
Brave Warrior was released on DVD on August 6, 2013, by Sony Pictures Home Entertainment.

References

Sources

External links
 
 

1952 films
1952 Western (genre) films
American Western (genre) films
Columbia Pictures films
Films adapted into comics
Films directed by Spencer Gordon Bennet
War of 1812 films
1950s English-language films
1950s American films